Julia Wong may refer to:

 Julia Wong (field hockey) (born 1975), Canadian former field hockey player
 Julia Wong (film editor), American film editor
 Julia Wong (politician), Norwegian politician

See also
 Julia Wong Pei Xian (born 1987), badminton player from Malaysia.